Beiji Ge (北极阁) is a hill in Nanjing. It's on the east of Gulou. It's also called Qintian Mountain (钦天山). In Ming Dynasty, the government set some meteorology measure device on the mountain. In 1927, Zhu Kezhen built the first meteorological institute on the hill. This is the beginning of China's modern meteorological research.

Geography of Nanjing